Harold McCartney (birth registered second ¼ 1945) is an English former professional rugby league footballer who played in the 1960s. He played at club level for Castleford (Heritage № 478).

Background
Harold McCartney's birth was registered in Pontefract district, West Riding of Yorkshire, England.

Playing career

County League appearances
Harold McCartney played in Castleford's victory in the Yorkshire County League during the 1964–65 season.

BBC2 Floodlit Trophy Final appearances
Harold McCartney played right-, i.e. number 10, in Castleford's 7-2 victory over Swinton in the 1966 BBC2 Floodlit Trophy Final during the 1966–67 season at Wheldon Road, Castleford on Tuesday 20 December 1966.

References

External links
Search for "McCartney" at rugbyleagueproject.org
Harold McCartneyMemory Box Search at archive.castigersheritage.com

1945 births
Living people
Castleford Tigers players
English rugby league players
Rugby league players from Pontefract
Rugby league props